Cyperus kilimandscharicus is a species of sedge that is native to an area of eastern Africa.

The species was first formally described by the botanist Georg Kükenthal in 1925.

See also
 List of Cyperus species

References

kilimandscharicus
Plants described in 1925
Taxa named by Georg Kükenthal
Flora of Tanzania
Flora of Ethiopia
Flora of Kenya